LISA Academy North is an open-enrollment public charter high school located near North Little Rock in Sherwood, Arkansas, United States. LISA Academy North or Little Scholars of Arkansas Academy – North Little Rock serves students in grades 6 through 12 and is administered by the LISA Academy Charter School.

LISA Academy North is a non-sectarian, non-discriminatory, tuition-free school financed by Arkansas State Board of Education. However, it is exempt from many public school regulations so that it can pursue an innovative approach that is designed to improve student performance. The first school year (2008–09) the institution began with grades K thru 8 with an enrollment of about 300 students. It is operated by the LISA Foundation, which formed the first LISA Academy in Little Rock in 2004 as the state's first charter school.

Academics 
As a public charter school, LISA Academy North exceeds the requirements of the Smart Core curriculum developed the Arkansas Department of Education (ADE), which requires students to complete 22 credit units before graduation. Students engage in regular and Advanced Placement (AP) coursework and exams, preparatory courses in ACT/SAT testing, leadership workshops, and partnerships with local colleges and universities. The school's focus is on STEM (science, mathematics, engineering and technology) fields.

Extracurricular activities 
The LISA Academy North mascot for academic and athletic team is the Jaguar with school colors of red and white.

Traditions 
LISA Academy has a tradition of involving parents through monthly activities.  The most popular events are Muffins with moms, Doughnuts with Dads, Cookies with Grandparents, Fall Festival, and Car show.  Home visits are also scheduled from staff based on the parent availability.

Solar Car Engineering 
LISA Academy North has participated in the Solar Car Challenge competition in Texas Motor Speedway, Fort Worth, Texas since 2017. High School students have designed, built and completed their solar car.  They have competed in the Classic and Advanced Classis Divisions. In 2021, the team was awarded 1st place in 2- and 3-D mechanical drawing of the car. LISA North has the only solar car team in the state of Arkansas.

Athletics 
The LISA Academy North Jaguars participate in various interscholastic activities in the 1A 5 North Conference administered by the Arkansas Activities Association. The Jaguars compete in volleyball, golf (boys/girls), basketball (boys), tennis (boys/girls) and soccer (boys/girls).

See also 

 LISA Academy

References

External links 
 

2008 establishments in Arkansas
Charter schools in Arkansas
Educational institutions established in 2008
Public high schools in Arkansas
Public middle schools in Arkansas
Schools in Pulaski County, Arkansas
Buildings and structures in Sherwood, Arkansas
High schools in Sherwood, Arkansas